Crazylegs Crane is a 16-episode made-for-television cartoon series produced by DePatie–Freleng Enterprises in 1978 for The All New Pink Panther Show on ABC.

Production
This was Crazylegs Crane's first series dedicated solely to him. Previously, he had made regular appearances in the three DePatie-Freleng animated comedies, Tijuana Toads, The Blue Racer and The Dogfather. Larry D. Mann voiced him in all but two of his appearances, with Bob Holt voicing him in the Tijuana Toads short "Flight to the Finish", and Daws Butler voicing him in the Dogfather short "The Goose That Laid a Golden Egg". His personality is similar to the Disney character Goofy. In the German series, this character was known as "Dummvogel", literally "stupid bird".

The character's name was never spoken in the theatrical shorts, only being referred to as a "chicken" or a "crane" by other characters. When his own series entered production he was initially called "Ichabod Crane" before settling on "Crazylegs Crane".

Plot
In the cartoons that star Crazylegs Crane (voiced by Larry D. Mann), he always goes through various misadventures (often accompanied by his son Crazylegs Crane Jr. (voiced by Frank Welker)) and often deals with his frenemy, a fire-breathing dragonfly (voiced by Frank Welker impersonating Andy Kaufman).

None of the shorts contained any credit information; only the series title and episode title were shown.

Theatrical shorts
 Go For Croak (1969, Tijuana Toads)
 Snake in the Gracias (1971, Tijuana Toads)
 Two Jumps and a Chump (1971, Tijuana Toads)
 The Egg and Ay Yi Yi! (1971, Tijuana Toads)
 A Leap in the Deep (1971, Tijuana Toads)
 Flight to the Finish (1972, Tijuana Toads)
 Blue Aces Wild (1973, The Blue Racer)
 Snake Preview (1973, The Blue Racer)
 Aches and Snakes (1973, The Blue Racer)
 The Goose That Laid a Golden Egg (1974, The Dogfather)
 Mother Dogfather (1974, The Dogfather)

Episodes
 Life With Feather
 Crane Brained
 King of the Swamp
 Sonic Broom
 Winter Blunderland
 Storky and Hatch
 Fly by Knight
 Sneaker Snack
 Barnacle Bird
 Animal Crack-ups
 Jet Feathers
 Nest Quest
 Bug Off
 Beach Bummer
 Flower Power
 Trail of the Lonesome Mine

Reruns
Crazylegs Crane previously aired as part of The All-New Pink Panther Show on This TV on Tuesdays and Thursdays at 8:30am Eastern Time until September 22, 2011. Also, most of the shorts often air as filler material on Boomerang. Some episodes have also appeared on YouTube, Hulu and other online video sites.

Home video
A DVD and Blu-ray containing the 16 episodes were released on April 26, 2016 from Kino Lorber.

References

External links
 

1970s American animated television series
1978 American television series debuts
Animated television series about birds
Television series by DePatie–Freleng Enterprises
Television series by MGM Television
The Pink Panther Show
Television characters introduced in 1969
American children's animated comedy television series